Frank Juul Strømbo (born 15 February 1963) is a Danish weightlifter. He competed in the men's heavyweight II event at the 1988 Summer Olympics.

References

1963 births
Living people
Danish male weightlifters
Olympic weightlifters of Denmark
Weightlifters at the 1988 Summer Olympics
Sportspeople from Copenhagen